J Vineyards & Winery is a California winery located in the Russian River Valley AVA of Sonoma County, California, owned and operated by E&J Gallo since 2015.

Wineries in Sonoma County
Healdsburg, California
American companies established in 1986
1986 establishments in California
Food and drink companies established in 1986